Josephine Keegan (born 1935), is a piano accompanist, musician and traditional Irish music composer.

Biography
Josephine Keegan was born in Dundee, Scotland in 1935. Her family came to County Armagh in 1939. They finally settled in Mullaghbane in 1950. Keegan got involved in music played in the area and played with the John Murphy céilí band. Keegan began competing and was successful in a number of them such as the Feis Ceoil in Dublin in 1955 where she won the Gold Medal going on to the first prize at the 1995 Oireachtas.

Keegan moved to London in 1963, and played with the Galtymore and Fulham bands among others. In 1969 she moved back to Ireland, where she played with fiddle player Sean Maguire. Keegan began working accompanying musicians on albums, mostly on piano. The musicians she worked with included Joe Burke, Séamus Tansey, Kevin Loughlin and Roger Sherlock. Between 1977 and 1982 Keegan recorded five solo albums. She played the fiddle on these albums, also playing her own accompaniment on piano. Keegan began to publish her compositions in 2002.

Awards
2003 Boston College 
2005 TG4 Composer of the Year 
2005 Newry and Mourne District Council

Bibliography
A drop in the ocean : traditional Irish tunes
Lifeswork : the compositions of Josephine Keegan
A few tunes 'now and then'
The Keegan tunes. book 4

Albums
The Keegan tunes. a selection of traditional Irish music
The Fairy Bridges
The Nightingale and Other Lesser Spotted Tunes

References and sources

1935 births
People from County Armagh
Traditional musicians
Irish composers
Living people
20th-century Irish women singers